The 2008 UC Davis football team represented the University of California, Davis as a member of the Great West Conference (GWC) during the 2008 NCAA Division I FCS football season. Led by 16th-year head coach Bob Biggs, UC Davis compiled an overall record of 5–7 with a mark of 2–1 in conference play, placing second in the GWC. The team outscored its opponents 342 to 326 for the season. The Aggies played home games at Aggie Stadium in Davis, California.

The GWC had previously been a football-only conference, but began sports other sports in the 2008–09 school year.

Schedule

UC Davis players in the NFL
No UC Davis Aggies players were selected in the 2009 NFL Draft.

The following finished their UC Davis career in 2008, were not drafted, but played in the NFL:

References

UC Davis
UC Davis Aggies football seasons
UC Davis Aggies football